Mauricio Alberto Villalta Ávila (19 November 1947 – 4 March 2017) was a Salvadoran footballer.

Club career
Villalta played for Alianza, with whom he won their first league title in 1966, Atlético Marte and FAS.

International career
He represented his country at the 1970 FIFA World Cup in Mexico and at the 1968 Summer Olympics also in Mexico.

References

External links

La historia de la clasificacion a la Copa Mundo 1970 – El Balón Cuscatleco 

1947 births
2017 deaths
Sportspeople from San Salvador
Association football midfielders
Salvadoran footballers
El Salvador international footballers
1970 FIFA World Cup players
Olympic footballers of El Salvador
Footballers at the 1968 Summer Olympics
Alianza F.C. footballers
C.D. Atlético Marte footballers
C.D. FAS footballers